Cecil Johnston Price (1925–1997) was an Irish Anglican priest during  the second half of the 20th century.

Price was educated at Trinity College, Dublin. He was ordained deacon in 1950 and priest in 1951. After  Curacies in Tralee and Cork he held incumbencies at Desertserges, Limerick, Bandon and  Delgany. He was Archdeacon of Glendalough from 1989 to 1994.

Notes

20th-century Irish Anglican priests
Archdeacons of Glendalough
Alumni of Trinity College Dublin
1997 deaths
1925 births